The Taranaki-King Country by-election was a by-election in the New Zealand electorate of Taranaki-King Country, a large and predominantly rural district in the west of New Zealand's North Island. It took place on 2 May 1998, and was precipitated by the resignation from parliament of sitting MP Jim Bolger. Bolger was retiring from politics, having recently been replaced as Prime Minister by Jenny Shipley.

The by-election was contested by all major parties. It was won by Shane Ardern, a member of Bolger's National Party, although Ardern gained a majority of only 988 votes. (In the 1996 general election Bolger had a majority of 10,223, or 37.37% in this seat.) Surprisingly, second place was won by Owen Jennings of the ACT party, a small party that promotes economic deregulation and other laissez-faire economic policies. The Labour Party, National's traditional opponent, was pushed back into third place. The Alliance, a left-wing party, gained fourth place. Some distance behind these four were Christian Heritage, New Zealand First, and the Greens, all with similar numbers of votes. They were followed by a group of minor parties and independents.

Results
The following table gives the election results:

References 

Taranaki-King Country 1998
1998 elections in New Zealand
Politics of Taranaki
Politics of Waikato
May 1998 events in New Zealand